Johannes Sipko Boersma (born 17 June 1935, in Groningen) is a Dutch archaeologist and emeritus professor at the Vrije Universiteit Amsterdam. He was elected a member of the Royal Netherlands Academy of Arts and Sciences in 1986. He obtained his PhD at the University of Groningen in 1970.

References

1935 births
Living people
20th-century Dutch archaeologists
Members of the Royal Netherlands Academy of Arts and Sciences
University of Groningen alumni
Academic staff of Vrije Universiteit Amsterdam
People from Groningen (city)